Free fatty acid receptor 1 (FFA1), also known as GPR40, is a class A G-protein coupled receptor that in humans is encoded by the FFAR1 gene. It is strongly expressed in the cells of the pancreas and to a lesser extent in the brain. This membrane protein binds free fatty acids, acting as a nutrient sensor for regulating energy homeostasis.

Activation/Inhibition
The protein FFA1 is activated by medium to long chain fatty acids. FFA1 is most strongly activated by eicosatrienoic acid (20:3Δ11,14,17), but has been found to be activated by fatty acids as small as 10 carbons long. For saturated fatty acids the level of activation is dependent on the length of the carbon chain, which is not true for unsaturated fatty acids. It has been found that three hydrophilic residues (arginine-183, asparagine-244, and arginine-258) anchor the carboxylate group of a fatty acid, which activates FFA1.

In the pancreas 

FFA1 is found in highest concentration in Islets of Langerhans, the endocrine portion of the pancreas. Activation of FFA1 results in an increase in cytosolic Ca2+ via the phosphoinositide pathway. When a free fatty acid docks on FFA1, the membrane protein becomes activated. This activation causes one of its subunits to dissociate from the receptor, which then activates phospholipase C (PLC) which is found in the cell membrane. PLC in turn hydrolyzes phosphatidylinositol 4,5-bisphosphate (PIP2),which is also in the membrane, to diacyl glycerol (DAG) which stays in the membrane, and inositol 1,4,5-triphosphate (IP3), which enters the cytosol. IP3 can then dock on a calcium channel in the endoplasmic reticulum which will facilitate the release of Ca2+ into the cytosol.]
The Ca2+ that is released then initiates a signal cascade, resulting in the secretion of insulin. A high concentration of glucose in the blood has been found to increase the transcription of the FFA1 gene, which has made these receptors a new target for the treatment of type II diabetes. While fatty acids themselves do not elicit insulin secretion, FFA1 activation increases the amount of insulin being secreted through various linked pathways. It has also been shown that chronic exposure to high amounts of free fatty acids, like on a high fat diet, can impair the function and secretory capacity of pancreatic β-cells.

In the brain

As stated previously, FFA1 has an affinity for long chain fatty acids. Such fatty acids are also present in the brain, where FFA1 has also been found in high abundance. FFA1 receptors are present over the entire brain, but in highest numbers in the medulla oblongata and the substantia nigra. Recent studies have also observed that FFA1 was present in the olfactory bulb, striatum, hippocampus, midbrain, hypothalamus, cerebellum, cerebral cortex and in the spinal cord.

Fatty acids play an important role in normal brain development as well as maintaining proper neuronal function. It has been found that certain fatty acids that are in abundance in the brain may be linked with FFA1. These fatty acids likely activate FFA1, inducing an intracellular response. It has been found that docosahexaenoic acid (DHA) has a higher affinity than other fatty acids for FFA1. DHA makes up 30% and arachidonic acid, another fatty acid found in the brain, makes up 20% of the fatty acids in the brain. Both of these fatty acids must be obtained from the diet because the body cannot make them. A correct balance of these fatty acids is vital to normal brain function and structure. DHA is supplied to the brain via astrocytes, which release DHA so that it reaches a high enough concentration to act as an extracellular signal on FFA1.

The abundance of FFA1 in the brain and the high affinity for DHA suggest that FFA1 may play a role in neuronal function in the brain. It is hypothesized that DHA and arachidonic acid could improve memory function by interacting with FFA1 in the hippocampus neurons. This hypothesis is based on the idea that once FFA1 is activated by these fatty acids, the resulting signal is related to progenitor cell proliferation. This implies that FFA1 signaling could stimulate the production of new memory cells in the brain. More research needs to be done in proving these suggestions, but if proven to be true FFA1 could be a target in producing new memory cells that are destroyed by diseases like Alzheimer's and Parkinson's disease.

Additionally, FFA1 abundance in the brain has been suggested to play a role in pain. DHA has been reported to induce an increased tolerance for pain without binding to opioid receptors. Researchers have hypothesized that stimulation of FFA1 by DHA could accelerate the release of endorphins, which is how DHA could induce an increased tolerance to pain. DHA binds to FFA1, which could activate a signaling cascade that leads to Ca2+ influx, which then leads to accelerated endorphin release and novel pain control. Again, additional research must be done to fully understand the mechanism and to prove these hypotheses, but the implications could provide additional targets for pain control in individuals.

Oral Fat Detection

FFA1(GPR40) has been implicated in the ability to taste fats. It is expressed in taste bud cells (specifically cell type I), and its absence leads to reduced preference to two types of fatty acid (linoleic acid and oleic acid), as well as decreased neuronal response to fatty acids administered orally.

Mediator role in pathologic fibrotic pathways
GPR40 was discovered to be a major mediator in pathologic fibrotic pathways in 2018.

Drugs under investigation

FFA1 in Breast Cancer
FFA1 has been found to be expressed in the human breast cancer cell line MCF-7. An increase in [Ca2+], which is a consequence of FFA1 activation, has been shown to modulate processes required for breast cancer cell proliferation. This suggests that FFA1 plays a crucial role in breast cancer proliferation. To further demonstrate this connection, pertussis toxin, which is a very specific inhibitor of GPCRs like FFA1, was found to diminish cancer cell proliferation. Also, using a PLC inhibitor diminished proliferation.

See also
 Free fatty acid receptor

References

Further reading

G protein-coupled receptors